Khimel is an Indian village situated between Rani and Falna rail station in the Pali District of Rajasthan state. Khimel is divided into two parts: the village and dhani. Khimel is a village in Bali Tehsil in Pali District of Rajasthan, India. It belongs to Jodhpur Division . It is located 60 km towards South from District headquarters Pali. 22 km from Bali. 362 km from State capital Jaipur 
Khimel Pin code is 306115 and postal head office is Rani Sadar Bazar.
Khimel have a small railway station where only local trains halts. Khimel receives 24/7 electricity (load shedding does occur but very less). This region is called Gorwar and popular language is Marwari. 
Falna, Bali, Sadri, Sumerpur are the nearby Cities to Khimel.	

Historically, the village is quite ancient. According to the inscriptions of Lord Rishabhdev in the fifty-two jinalayas, its ancient name was Sinhavalli. This village is more ancient than 11th century, based on the book Jain Tirtha Sarve Sangraksha.		

Khimel Population according to 2011 Census:
Total population is 4272 and number of houses are 890. Female Population is 53.2%. Village literacy rate is 54.0% and the Female Literacy rate is 23.9%.

Employment:

Majority of the people have migrated to other cities like Mumbai & Pune for better earning. But, now we can observe that people are in fact doing business in the village itself instead of migrating. Construction work is popular nowadays.

Development:

Road connectivity is good. Schools are available in nearby cities.
A Girls college (Vidhyawari) is located nearby.
However, the village lacks in basic necessity like Water (once in 3 days), ATM, Banks, A good College (that can provide employment to the students other than becoming a school teacher or searching for Govt. Jobs), Computer institutes, Retail stores, a gymkhana, Petrol Pump and a fly over above the Khimel River (add few more if you believe that is a necessity in the village).

Demographics

According to Census 2011, Khimel has a population of 4,272, where male are 2000 and female are 2,272

Places of interest

Temples
Jain Temple is one of the major attraction of Khimel. This temple was built in 1077 (1134 V.S.). The Moolnayak of this temple is a white-coloured 75-cm-tall statue of Shantinatha in Padmasan posture. It is said that this idol was established by Achary Shri Hemsurishwarji. Shree Panchmukhi Hanuman Ji Temple with 84 phare, Mata Temple, lord Shiva Temple this place you can visit here.

References

External links
 Kishore Mal Khimavat

Villages in Pali district
11th-century Jain temples